Isaac Henry Gosset (1713–1799) was an 18th-century sculptor and wax-modeller.

Life

He was born in St Helier on the Isle of Jersey on 2 May 1713,the sixth son of Jean Gosset. His parents had fled from Normandy around 1700 after the revocation of the Edict of Nantes. These incomers were known as Huguenots. He was sent to London to train with his elder brother Gideon Gosset under their paternal uncle, Matthew Gosset (1683-1744), a wax-modeller and frame-carver, and member of the Spalding Society. The Gosset company supplied frames to William Hogarth and Thomas Gainsborough. The wax used was of his own recipe and was highly praised in his field. 

He exhibited at the Society of Arts (which linked to the Incorporated Society of Artists) and Free Society from 1760 to 1778. Josiah Wedgwood also contracted him as a modeller to produce cameos. Henry Hoare was a huge fan of his works and collected a substantial number from 1753 to 1755 which were (and are) displayed at Stourhead.

Horace Walpole also collected his work, which he displayed at Strawberry Hill. However, the greatest accolade is the collection held at Windsor Castle and displayed in the library purchased by King George III around 1765 to 1770.

He died in Kensington on 28 November 1799 and is buried in Old Marylebone Cemetery.

Many of his works are held by the Victoria and Albert Museum.

Works

Benjamin Hoadly (1756) Stourhead
Charles Townshend (1756) NPG
Henry Seymour Conway (1757) NPG
James Wolfe (1759)
George Edwards (1763)
King George III and Queen Charlotte (1776)
Richard Hurd Bishop of Worcester (dnk)
Lord Thurlow
The Duke of York
Dr Harris
David Garrick
General Wolfe
Gideon Gosset
Duke of Sussex
Prince Regent
Henry Pelham
George Grenville
Duke of Grafton
Lord Bathurst
Robert Lowth, Bishop of London (c.1778)
Lord Maynard
Richard Trevor, Bishop of Durham
Francis Hutcheson
Earl of Mansfield
Mrs Delany (1776)
George Selwyn
General Henry Conway
Thomas Townshend
Lord Camden
Sir Jeffery Amherst
Frederick, Prince of Wales - Stourhead
Lady Mary Coke Stourhead
Charles Townshend Stourhead -moved to NPG
Miss Conyers (1763)
Miss Palmer (1763)
Duke of Newcastle
4th Earl of Bristol at Ickworth Park
General Maclean (1779) at Buxted Park
Robert Carteret, 3rd Earl Granville at Bowood
Countess of Shelburne (wife of the Prime Minister) at Bowood
Charles Yorke at Hartlebury Castle
Richard Hurd, Bishop of Worcester at Hartlebury Castle
Prince Octavius at Hartlebury Castle
Fisher Littleton at Hartlebury Castle
Lord Mansfield at Hartlebury Castle
Ralph Allen at Hartlebury Castle
George, Prince of Wales WC
Ferdinand, Duke of Brunswick WC
Edward, Duke of York WC
Frederick, Prince of Wales WC
Princess Augusta of Saxe-Gotha WC

Family

He was married to Françoise Buisett (also a Huguenot) in Soho in 1737. They were parents to six children.

Artistic recognition

Gosset was portrayed by Thomas Gainsborough, probably due to their business connection.

Gallery

References
 

1713 births
1799 deaths
Jersey people
British sculptors